Paul Axtell Kellogg (April 11, 1910 – May 28, 1999) was a diocesan bishop in the Episcopal Church who served in the Dominican Republic from 1960 until his retirement in 1972.

References

1910 births
1999 deaths
Episcopal bishops of the Dominican Republic